Pat or Patrick McNamara may refer to:

 Pat McNamara (Australian politician) (born 1949), Australian politician
 Pat McNamara (Irish politician) (born 1938), mayor of Galway
 Pat McNamara (footballer) (1912–1983), Australian rules footballer
 Pat McNamara (speed skater) (1925–2011), American speed skater
 Patrick V. McNamara (1894–1966), American politician
 Patrick McNamara (neuroscientist) (born 1956), American neuroscientist
 Patrick Macnamara (1886–1957), British admiral

See also
 McNamara (surname)